Kingdom of Madness is the second album by the German power metal band Edguy, released in 1997. It is usually referred to as their "official" debut album since it was the first to be professionally recorded and to receive record company distribution.

Track listing
All lyrics by Tobias Sammet. Music as indicated.

 "Paradise" (Sammet, Jens Ludwig) – 6:24 
 "Wings of a Dream" (Sammet) – 5:24
 "Heart of Twilight" (Sammet, Ludwig) – 5:32 
 "Dark Symphony" (Sammet, Ludwig) – 1:05 
 "Deadmaker" (Sammet, Ludwig) – 5:15 
 "Angel Rebellion" (Sammet, Ludwig) – 6:44 
 "When a Hero Cries" (Sammet) – 3:59
 "Steel Church" (Sammet, Ludwig, Dominik Storch) – 6:29 
 "The Kingdom" (Sammet) – 18:23

Personnel
Band members
Tobias Sammet – vocals, bass, piano, keyboards
Jens Ludwig – guitar
Dirk Sauer – guitar
Dominik Storch – drums

Additional musicians
Chris Boltendahl (from Grave Digger) - guest vocals on track 9

Production
Erik Grösch - producer, engineer
Ralph Hubert - engineer

References

Edguy albums
1997 albums
AFM Records albums